Dz is a digraph of the Latin script, consisting of the consonants D and Z. It may represent , , or , depending on the language.

Usage by language
Dz generally represents  in Latin alphabets, including Hungarian, Kashubian, Latvian, Lithuanian, Polish, Slovak, and romanized Macedonian. However, in Dene Suline (Chipewyan) and Cantonese Pinyin it represents , and in Vietnamese it is a pronunciation respelling of the letter D to represent .

Esperanto
Some Esperanto grammars, notably Plena Analiza Gramatiko de Esperanto, consider dz to be a digraph for the voiced affricate , as in edzo "husband". The case for this is "rather weak". Most Esperantists, including Esperantist linguists (Janton, Wells), reject it.

Hungarian

 is the seventh letter of the Hungarian alphabet.  It is called dzé as a letter of the alphabet, where it represents the voiced alveolar affricate phoneme .

⟨Dz⟩ and ⟨dzs⟩ were recognized as individual letters in the 11th edition of Hungarian orthography (1984).  Prior to that, they were analyzed as two-letter combinations ⟨d⟩+⟨z⟩ and ⟨d⟩+⟨zs⟩.

Length
Like most Hungarian consonants, the sound  can be geminated.  However, the letter is only doubled in writing (to ) when an assimilated suffix is added to the stem: eddze, lopóddzon.

In several words, it is pronounced long, e.g. bodza, madzag, edz, pedz. In some other ones, short, e.g. dzadzíki, dzéta, Dzerzsinszkij (usually at the beginning of words), though it is always short after another consonant (e.g. in brindza).

In several verbs ending in -dzik (approximately fifty), there is a free alternation with -zik, e.g. csókolódzik or csókolózik, lopódzik or lopózik. In some other verbs, there is a difference in meaning: levelez(ik) "to correspond", but leveledzik "to produce leaves".

Collation

Polish
Dz generally represents .

Examples of dz 
 (bell)
 (kind, type)

Compare dz followed by i:
 (child)
 (girl, girlfriend)

Slovak
In Slovak, the digraph dz is the ninth letter of the Slovak alphabet. Example words with this phoneme include:
 medzi = between, among
 hrádza = dam, dike

The digraph may never be divided by hyphenation:
 medzi → me-dzi
 hrádza  → hrá-dza

However, when d and z come from different morphemes, they are treated as separate letters, and must be divided by hyphenation:
 odzemok = type of folk dance → od-ze-mok
 nadzvukový = supersonic → nad-zvu-ko-vý
In both cases od- (from) and nad- (above) are a prefix to the stems zem (earth) and zvuk (sound).

Vietnamese

Z is not included in the Vietnamese alphabet as a letter in its own right.

Many Vietnamese cultural figures spell their family names, pen names, or stage names with Dz instead of D, emphasizing the Hanoian pronunciation. Examples include the songwriter Dzoãn Mẫn, the poet Hồ Dzếnh, and the television chef Nguyễn Dzoãn Cẩm Vân. Other examples include Bùi Dzinh and Trương Đình Dzu.

Some Overseas Vietnamese residing in English-speaking countries also replace D with Dz in their names. A male named  may spell his name  to avoid being called "dung" in social contexts. Examples of this usage include Vietnamese-Americans Việt Dzũng and Dzung Tran. (Occasionally, D is instead replaced by Y to emphasize the Saigonese pronunciation, as with Yung Krall.)

Unicode 
Dz is represented in Unicode as three separate glyphs within the Latin Extended-B block.  It is one of the rare characters that has separate glyphs for each of its uppercase, title case, and lowercase forms.

The single-character versions are designed for compatibility with Yugoslav encodings supporting Romanization of Macedonian, where this digraph corresponds to the Cyrillic letter Ѕ.

Variants
Additional variants of the ǲ digraph are also encoded in Unicode.

 is used in the Croatian, Bosnian, and Slovak alphabets as a letter in its own right.
 is the all-capitals form of U+01C5 (ǅ).
 is the lowercase form of U+01C5 (ǅ).
 was historically used to represent the Voiced alveolar affricate in the International Phonetic Alphabet.
 is the superscript form of U+02A3 and is an IPA superscript letter
 was historically used to represent the Voiced alveolo-palatal affricate in the IPA.
 is the superscript form of U+02A5 and is an IPA superscript letter
 is used in Sinological and Tibetanist transcription for a voiced retroflex affricate.
 is the superscript form of U+AB66 and is an IPA superscript letter
 is a ligature of lowercase d and ezh (a z with a tail), formerly used in the IPA
 is the superscript form of U+02A4 and is an IPA superscript letter
 is used in phonetic transcription
 has been used in phonetic descriptions of Polish

References 

Polish language
Hungarian language
Latin-script digraphs
Vietnamese language